State Highway 41 (SH 41) is a State Highway in Kerala, India that starts in Palarivattom and ends in Thekkady. The highway is 155.1 km long.

The Route Map 
Palarivattom – Kakkanad – pallikkara – Kizhakkambalam – Pattimattom - Valamboor – Muvattupuzha – Pandappilly – Arikkuzha - Chittoor - Manakkad - Thodupuzha - Moolamattom - vagamon -  Chottupara – Upputhara – Kumily - Thekkady

See also 
Roads in Kerala
List of State Highways in Kerala

References 

State Highways in Kerala
Roads in Ernakulam district
Roads in Idukki district